Abbas ibn Ali Mazyadid was heir to the throne of Shirvanshahs, the title of the Muslim rulers of Shirvan, located in the modern day Azerbaijan Republic. He was expected to become shah as "Abbas I" after his father Shirvanshah Ali's death. However, he was captured along with his son Abu Bakr and father in rebellion of his great uncle Muhammed III Shirvanshah and executed.

References

10th-century Iranian people